Maria was a brigantine built in Dublin, Ireland, and launched in 1823 as a passenger ship. On 28 June 1840, she wrecked on the Margaret Brock Reef, near Cape Jaffa in the Colony of South Australia, somewhere south-west of the current site of the town of Kingston SE, South Australia. The wreck has never been located.

Aboriginal Australians on the Coorong massacred some or all of the 17 survivors of the wreck as they journeyed to Adelaide, an event known as the Maria massacre. A punitive expedition, acting under instructions from Governor Gawler that were later found to be unlawful, summarily hanged two presumed culprits.

History

Background 

Maria was launched from Grand Canal Dock, Dublin, in 1823. The data below are from Lloyd's Register (LR).

Maria no longer appears in LR in 1835 and subsequently. She may have transferred her registry to Australia.

Final voyage
Maria left Port Adelaide on 26 June 1840 for Hobart Town, Van Diemens Land, with 25 persons on board, including the captain, William Ettrick Smith, and his wife. Passengers included Samuel Denham and Mrs Denham (née Muller) and their five children (Thomas, Andrew, Walter, Fanny, and Anna); the recently-widowed Mrs York (sister of Samuel Denham), and her infant; James Strutt (previously with Lonsdale's Livery Stables, hired as Mrs Denham's servant); George Young Green and Mrs Green; Thomas Daniel and Mrs Daniel; and Mr. Murray. The ship's mate and crew were John Tegg, John Griffiths, John Deggan/Durgan/Dengan, James Biggins, John Cowley, Thomas Rea, George Leigh and James Parsons.

During the voyage, Maria foundered on the Margaret Brock Reef (named later, after the 1852 shipwreck of the barque Margaret Brock), which lies west of Cape Jaffa on the south-east coast of South Australia. Eight people died, and survivors made their way to the coast somewhere near the site of the present Kingston SE.

Massacre 

The passengers and crew safely reached land. Accounts suggest that the passengers commenced trekking on the land side of the Coorong coast towards the lakes (Alexandrina and Albert), with the sailors heading inland at some point.

Two days later some of this latter group split from the party in the hope of rejoining the Captain. Around this time they were attacked and killed by a group of the Milmenrura (or "Big Murray Tribe", now known as Tanganekald, also known as Tenkinyra), stripped of their possessions, hit over the head, decapitated and buried in the sand or in wombat holes.

Such detail of how the Maria survivors came to be widely separated into three groups can only be supposition, as none lived to tell the tale. The body of the captain was found far removed from the others, and no trace of the crew members was ever found, so it is not known whether they suffered the same fate as the passengers. One contemporary noted that survivors of the schooner Fanny (Capt. James Gill), wrecked in the same area two years earlier (21 June 1838), were given every assistance by, presumably, men from the same tribe.

In 2003 Ngarrindjeri elder Tom Trevorrow said that the story was well known among his elders, and that he was told the survivors had met up with their people. According to Trevorrow, the Ngarrindjeri group offered them "fire, water and food...It was the duty of male people to help these people. But every time they'd come to a boundary line, they had to hand them over to the next lakayinyeri (family group) — the Milmendura". He was told that the crew members had tried "to sexually interfere with them". The Ngarrindjeri people warned the sailors that this was not their way, and that their tribal law would punish such behaviour by death. At some point after this, a violent fight broke out, and the survivors of Maria were all killed.

Response 
Word of the murders of multiple white people by natives reached Adelaide and William Pullen. A group of sailors and three Aboriginal interpreters, with Pullen in charge, set out to investigate on 28 July, and on 30 July reached a massacre site, recovering two wedding rings. On 1 August, they encountered a group of Aboriginal Australians in possession of blankets and clothing. They returned to Adelaide with the rings, which were identified as belonging to Mrs York and Mrs Denham.  The group reported finding "legs, arms and parts of bodies partially covered with sand and strewn in all directions", and a trail of footprints leading from the area. They also said they had found local natives with blankets and one was wearing a sailor's jacket.

Governor Gawler commissioned Major O'Halloran to investigate further and his party left Adelaide on 15 August. Reinforcements were called for and on 22 August, O'Halloran left Goolwa with a mounted troop, including Alexander Tolmer, Captain Henry Nixon, Charles Bonney, and Pullen. They followed the coast, while boats sailed parallel. On 23 August the force ran into a number of Aboriginal Australians and rounded up 13 men, two boys, and 50 women and children. O'Halloran shackled the men and set the others free, though they remained nearby voluntarily.

In his report, O'Halloran stated that his captives yielded up the man who had killed a whaler named Roach some two years previously, and pointed out where one of the Maria murderers could be found. O'Halloran pronounced a death sentence on them. Two Aboriginal Australians who tried to escape by swimming were shot and wounded. Maria's log-book was recovered in one of their wurleys, as were numerous articles of clothing, some blood-stained, and other incriminating evidence. At 3.00pm on 25 August, the two condemned men were summarily hanged from sheaoaks near the graves.

O'Halloran was not exceeding his brief; he was following his instructions from Governor Gawler, whose instructions were:
"...when to your conviction you have identified any number, not exceeding three, of the actual murderers...you will there explain to the blacks the nature of your conduct ...and you will deliberately and formally cause sentence of death to be executed by shooting or hanging".

In Australia, little blame was apportioned to O'Halloran for his part in this affair; not so for Governor Gawler, who was severely criticised by sections of the press, notably the Register. In London, the Colonial Office was of the opinion that both Gawler and O'Halloran were liable to be tried for murder. The Aborigines' Protection Society roundly condemned Gawler's actions. The Society also questioned the legality of the actions; the Chief Justice, though, was of the opinion that South Australian law could not be applied, because the tribe had not pledged allegiance to the Crown. The controversy may have played a part in Gawler's recall some months later.

In a sketchbook by the then Surveyor General of South Australia, Edward Charles Frome, there is a sketch of a Milmenrura village in the south-east consisting of a cluster of about twelve established homes. It is annotated with the note “burnt by me, October 1840”.

On 10 April 1841, members of the Tenkinyra tribe guided Richard Penny to a spot where they promised the remains of a drowned white man were buried. He believed it would be Captain Collet Barker, who was speared to death in the same area on 30 April 1831. They found instead the bodies of four of the five from Maria still unaccounted for; one drowned and four bashed to death. The Aboriginals told Penny that the attack had followed the shipwrecked party's refusal to hand over clothing that they had considered their just entitlement for guiding and sustaining the group and carrying the children across their land. The Maria party had promised plenty of blankets and clothing from Adelaide after they returned, but the Aboriginals started to help themselves to the goods and a fight ensued, ending in the killing of the shipwrecked party.

Afterwards
Maria's hull was never found, though pieces of wreckage washed ashore at Lacepede Bay. In 1972 a diver recovered a rubber gudgeon which may have come from either the Maria or the Margaret Brock. There have been rumours of gold sovereigns aboard the ship, but records have not confirmed this. There were stories of coins being passed around the Ngarrandjeri people, which may have been traded by survivors before the massacre.

It is hoped that the wreck may one day be located, using advanced remote sensing technology. This would be of great historical value. Senior maritime heritage officer Amer Khan of the Department of Environment, Water and Natural Resources State Heritage Unit, said that such a discovery could help to reveal the chain of events which led up to the tragedy. Khan suspects the wreck lies somewhere near Cape Jaffa, where the treacherous Margaret Brock reef is located.

A cannon reported to have belonged to the Maria and which "was probably carried for the look of the thing or for signalling" was purchased from the Lee family of Middleton by D. H. Cudmore around 1914 as a garden feature for his home "Adare" in Victor Harbor, South Australia, then as a family tradition fired to welcome each New Year.
A bell, claimed to have belonged to the ship, was acquired by Nuriootpa High School in 1942.

A plaque commemorating the wreck of Maria was unveiled at Kingston SE on 18 February 1966.

Maria Creek was named as a reminder of the wreck.

See also
List of shipwrecks of Australia
Rufus River massacre

Notes 
Names of Aboriginal groups are as reported in the contemporary press. They must have been tribes or clans of the Ngarrindjeri people but may have no connection with any later group. The group here written as "Milmenrura" has elsewhere been described as the Milmendjuri clan of the Tanganekald tribe.

References

Further reading
 Judy  Hamman, “The Coorong Massacre: A Study In Early Race Relations In South Australia.” Flinders Journal of History & Politics. 1973, Vol. 3, pp 1–9.
Letter from Matthew Moorhouse (20 February 1841), Accounts and Papers 1843, Volume 3 (London: William Clowes and Sons) p. 326-328.
"Asiatic Intelligence—Australasia", The Asiatic Journal and Monthly Register for British and Foreign India, China, and Australasia, 34 (Part II): 201-206 (March 1841).
"The Maria Massacre—And A Lost Treasure", The News, 21 February 1942, p. 5 - via Trove.
"Murder, missing gold and lost shipwreck: Dark tale of the Maria massacre"  —ABC News (5 November 2015)
 Summers J. (1986),  "Colonial race relations", The Flinders History of South Australia: Social history (editor—Richards E.) p. 283-311 (Wakefield Press).

1823 ships
Shipwrecks of South Australia
Massacres by Indigenous Australians
Brigantines of Australia
Maritime incidents in June 1840
Australian frontier wars
Indigenous Australians in South Australia
1840 crimes in Australia
Massacres in 1840